The  Our Lady of the Rosary Church Also Notre Dame Du Rosaire church is the name given to a religious building that is affiliated with the Catholic Church and is located in the town of Saint Peter Port in Guernsey, a dependency of the British Crown, part of the Channel Islands.

The church follows the Latin or Roman rite and is located within the Roman Catholic Diocese of Portsmouth (Dioecesis Portus Magni) based in Portsmouth, England, UK.

History 

The church was originally dedicated to St. Mary and opened in September 1829, being closed temporarily in 1851 after the opening of the Church of St. Joseph.

It was reopened in 1860 being placed in the hands of French religious and dedicated to Our Lady of the Rosary. It was restored between 1961 and 1962.

See also
Catholic Church in Guernsey

References

Roman Catholic churches in Guernsey
Churches in Guernsey
Our Lady of the Rosary
Roman Catholic churches completed in 1829
19th-century Roman Catholic church buildings in the United Kingdom